Podgora pri Zlatem Polju is a small settlement in the hills northeast of Lukovica pri Domžalah in the eastern part of the Upper Carniola region of Slovenia.

Name
The name of the settlement was changed from Podgora to Podgora pri Zlatem Polju in 1955.

Church
The Zlato Polje parish church in the settlement is dedicated to Mary Magdalene.

References

External links

Podgora pri Zlatem Polju on Geopedia

Populated places in the Municipality of Lukovica